The Mooney M10T is a light aircraft that was under development by Mooney Aircraft with an original proposed delivery date in 2017. The project was cancelled in April 2017.

The first flight of the proof of concept prototype was on 23 December 2015.

Design and development
The M10T is a three-seat, single engine, low-wing, tricycle gear composite aircraft, that was originally proposed as a new training aircraft. Although similar in configuration to the Ercoupe-based Mooney M10, the aircraft is an all-new design of composite construction with sidestick controls. The M10J is a parallel development, with a larger  engine and retractable landing gear.

The company planned to produce the design at its Chino, California plant initially, with the option of expanding to its Kerrville, Texas facility. Assembly was also considered for a new plant under construction in Hunan province, China.

In April 2017 the company indicated that development was canceled, but that their next-generation piston aircraft would use the knowledge they gained during the project.

Variants
M10T
Fixed gear trainer with Continental CD-135 diesel engine. One prototype built.
M10J
Retractable gear version with Continental CD-155 diesel engine. None completed.

Specifications (M10T)

References

External links
Mooney Project Announcement
New Mooneys: No Parachute? by Paul Bertorelli, AVweb

Low-wing aircraft
Mooney aircraft
Single-engined tractor aircraft
Abandoned civil aircraft projects of the United States
Aircraft first flown in 2015